Kristinehamn Municipality (Kristinehamns kommun) is a municipality in Värmland County in west central Sweden. Its seat is located in the city of Kristinehamn.

The present municipality was created in 1971 when the former City of Kristinehamn was merged with parts of the two dissolved rural municipalities Visnum and Väse.

Localities
Kristinehamn (seat)
Björneborg
Bäckhammar
Ölme

Sites of interest
The medieval island of Saxholmen, situated in the beautiful archipelago of Kristinehamn. There have been several archaeological excavations on the island during the past few years. There is a myth that once the cruel and hateful Saxe av Sachsen lived on the island with his wife and servants. His wife took off with her lover.
Östervik chapel is a unique small church which has a fascinating history and architecture.
Folk museum, the red-painted houses made of wood, the rushing of the water, and the bleating of the sheep make altogether a wonderful atmosphere and give you a memorable visit. Lundbomsgården is a middle-class home from the 19th century, the mill from the early 17th century.
Värmlands Säby manor house has typical 18th century qualities with beautiful tiled stoves and painted tapestries. There is also a unique hedge maze consisting of 1,747 bushes.

Elections
These are the results of the elections in the municipality since the first election after the municipal reform, being held in 1973. The exact results of Sweden Democrats were not listed at a municipal level by SCB from 1988 to 1998 due to the party's small size at the time. "Turnout" denotes the percentage of eligible people casting any ballots, whereas "Votes" denotes the number of valid votes only.

Riksdag

Blocs

This lists the relative strength of the socialist and centre-right blocs since 1973, but parties not elected to the Riksdag are inserted as "other", including the Sweden Democrats results from 1988 to 2006, but also the Christian Democrats pre-1991 and the Greens in 1982, 1985 and 1991. The sources are identical to the table above. The coalition or government mandate marked in bold formed the government after the election. New Democracy got elected in 1991 but are still listed as "other" due to the short lifespan of the party.

International relations

Twin towns — Sister cities

The municipality is twinned with:

  Brodnica, Poland (since 2003)
  Elva, Estonia (since 1992)
  Farsund, Norway (since 1945)
  Rautavaara, Finland (since 1971)
  Seinäjoki, Finland (since 1945)
  Skagen, Denmark

References

External links

Kristinehamn Municipality - Official site
Kristinehamn Information Service
 Article Kristinehamn - From Nordisk familjebok

Municipalities of Värmland County